ENX may refer to:
 ENX Association, an association of European vehicle manufacturers
 ISO 639:enx, the ISO 639 code for the Enxet language
 Euronext, the Euronext Paris code ENX